John Allerwich was an English politician who was MP for Warwick in 
1395. claims that this person was probably the Warton, Warwickshire tax collector of the same name recorded in 1413.

References

English MPs 1395
14th-century English politicians
People from Warwick